Solid PDF Creator is proprietary document processing software which converts virtually any Windows-based document into a PDF.  Suitable for home and office use, the program appears as a printer option in the Print menu of any print-capable Windows application.  The same technology used in the software's Solid Framework SDK is licensed by Adobe for Acrobat X

History
Solid Documents, the makers of Solid PDF Creator, launched the product in 2006 and have released several version updates since then including 2.0 in 2007.  The latest product enhancement, new to  version 7, allows for the conversion of Windows-based documents into PDF/A documents in compliance with ISO 19005-1 standards for long-term preservation and archival purposes.  Version 9.0, released in June 2014, sees conversion and table reconstruction improvements, less XML output, and feature integration.

Features
Solid PDF Creator supports conversion from the following formats into PDF:
Microsoft Word .docx and .doc
Rich text format .rtf
Microsoft Excel .xlsx
.xml
Microsoft PowerPoint .pptx
.html
Plain text .txt  
Solid PDF Creator provides a variety of file conversion options including password protection, encryption, permission definition, ISO 19005-1 archiving standards, and file compression capabilities.

Building upon the features offered in Solid PDF Creator, Solid PDF Creator Plus released in 2008 allows users to manipulate watermarks, rearrange pages, extract pages, and drag and drop content.

See also
List of PDF software

References

External links
Solid PDF Creator site
PC Tips 3000 Review
 Flex Developer’s Journal

PDF software